Titanic is one of the ten district electoral areas (DEA) in Belfast, Northern Ireland. Located in the east of the city, the district elects six members to Belfast City Council and contains the wards of Ballymacarrett, Beersbridge, Bloomfield, Connswater, Sydenham and Woodstock. Titanic, along with wards from the neighbouring Ormiston and Lisnasharragh DEAs, together with parts of Lisburn and Castlereagh District Council, form the Belfast East constituency for the Northern Ireland Assembly and UK Parliament.

The district was created for the 2014 local elections, largely replacing the Pottinger District Electoral Area, which had existed since 1985.

Councillors

2019 results

2014 results

References

Electoral wards of Belfast
2014 establishments in Northern Ireland